Cristhian Yonaiker Rivas Vielma (born 20 January 1997) is a Venezuelan footballer who plays as a midfielder

Career statistics

Club

Notes

References

1997 births
Living people
Venezuelan footballers
Venezuela youth international footballers
Association football midfielders
Estudiantes de Mérida players
Venezuelan Primera División players
Cuiabá Esporte Clube players
Venezuelan expatriate footballers
Venezuelan expatriate sportspeople in Brazil
Expatriate footballers in Brazil
People from Mérida, Mérida
21st-century Venezuelan people